Hora Prasad Joshi (Nepali: होराप्रसाद जोशी; 1925-2010) was a Nepali political figure who was crucial in shaping the politics of modern Nepali government. He was the Home Minister in B.P. Koirala's Nepali Congress, a social democratic political party. He also drafted the 1962 constitution for King Mahendra. He was also the Member Secretary of the National Health and Sports Council in 1958, and received a letter of felicitation for his contribution to Nepal's sports sector in 2002.

Hora Prasad Joshi wrote a book in 1958 called The Way to Political Stability: An Analysis discussing Nepal's tense political situation.

In 2006, a biography was written about his life and his role in Nepali politics. The biography, entitled Nabirsane ti dinaharu (नबिर्सने ती दिनहरु, translation: Those Days Which Cannot Be Forgotten), is available through the Library of Congress.

References

1925 births
2010 deaths
People from Kathmandu
Nepali Congress politicians from Bagmati Province
Durbar High School alumni